The 1895 Purdue Boilermakers football team was an American football team that represented Purdue University during the 1895 college football season. The Boilermakers compiled a 4–3 record and outscored their opponents by a total of 84 to 58 in their third season under head coach D. M. Balliet. C. H. Robertson was the team captain.

Schedule

References

Purdue
Purdue Boilermakers football seasons
Purdue Boilermakers football